Donacia malinovskyi is a species of leaf beetle of the subfamily Donaciinae.

Distribution
Distributed in the Central Europe from France to Poland and in the Eastern Europe in Volga Basin.

Description
The upper part of the body is dark green or purple, golden on the sides, at least the top of the golden-brown color. Elytron is straightly cut at the top. The median groove of prothorax is deep.

Ecology
The species can be found in the forest Noah and the steppe zones. Typically, the kinds of plants manna (Glyceria).

Aberration

References

Beetles described in 1810
Beetles of Europe
Donaciinae